Lozhki is a rural locality (a khutor) in Pyatiizbyanskoye Rural Settlement, Kalachyovsky District, Volgograd Oblast, Russia, just off the Don River.  The population was 36 as of 2010.

Geography 
Lozhki is located 20 km northwest of Kalach-na-Donu (the district's administrative centre) by road. Svetly Log is the nearest rural locality.

References 

Rural localities in Kalachyovsky District